Die Zaubergeige is a 1935 opera by Werner Egk to a libretto by Ludwig Strecker after Count Franz Pocci. Egk revised the opera in 1954.

Recordings 
 Die Zaubergeige (excerpts): Marcel Cordes, Erika Köth, Elisabeth Lindermeier, Gottlob Frick, Richard Holm, Choir & Orchestra of the Bayerisches Staatsoper, Werner Egk

References

1935 operas
German-language operas
Operas by Werner Egk

Operas